Folke Fredrik Fleetwood (15 November 1890 – 4 February 1949) was a Swedish track and field athlete who competed in the 1908 Summer Olympics and in the 1912 Summer Olympics.

In 1908 he participated in the Greek discus throw competition and in the discus throw event but in both competitions his final ranking is unknown.

Four years later he finished seventh in the two handed discus throw competition and 28th in the discus throw event.

References

External links
profile 

1890 births
1949 deaths
Swedish male discus throwers
Olympic athletes of Sweden
Athletes (track and field) at the 1908 Summer Olympics
Athletes (track and field) at the 1912 Summer Olympics